Xanthomendoza rosmarieae is a species of lichen in the family Teloschistaceae. Known only from the type locality in Sussex County, Delaware, it was described as new to science in 2011. It is named after the Swiss lichenologist Rosmarie Honegger.

References

Teloschistales
Lichen species
Lichens described in 2011
Lichens of North America
Taxa named by Ingvar Kärnefelt
Taxa named by Sergey Kondratyuk